KYRO (1280 kHz) is an American AM radio station in Troy, Missouri and serves the western suburbs of St. Louis. KYRO airs a Conservative News/Talk format and is owned by KYRO Group, LLC, and operated by Viper Broadcasting, LLC.  The News/Talk show line up includes Bob & Tom (5am9am), Glenn Beck (9am12pm), "The EDGE" (12pm2pm), Chris Plant (2pm5pm), "Happy Hour" w/ "Real-Rock" Tom Terbrock (5pm6pm), Ben Shapiro (6pm8pm), Dan Bongino (8pm9pm), Jim Bohannon (9pm12am) and Red Eye Radio Overnights.

KYRO is an affiliate of the Kansas City Chiefs (NFL), St. Louis Blues (NHL), University of Missouri (NCAA), MRN (NASCAR), PRN (NASCAR) Sports Networks, and originates Maryville University Hockey broadcasts (NCAA).

KYRO News (Fox News, Missouri-net, Brownfield Farm Networks) provides 24 hour weather and hourly updates from the KYRO Newsroom.

External links

YRO
News and talk radio stations in the United States